Bolgarka (Bolgarka, بولگاركا; , Bolgarka) is a selo in Alga District, Aktobe Region, west Kazakhstan. Population:

References

Aktobe Region
Populated places in Kazakhstan
Bulgarian communities